This article lists the squads for the 2019 Cyprus Women's Cup, the 12th edition of the Cyprus Women's Cup. The cup consisted of a series of friendly games, and was held in Cyprus from 27 February to 6 March 2019. The twelve national teams involved in the tournament registered a squad of 23 players.

The age listed for each player is on 27 February 2019, the first day of the tournament. The numbers of caps and goals listed for each player do not include any matches played after the start of tournament. The club listed is the club for which the player last played a competitive match prior to the tournament. The nationality for each club reflects the national association (not the league) to which the club is affiliated. A flag is included for coaches that are of a different nationality than their own national team.

Group A

Czech Republic
Coach: Karel Rada

The squad was announced on 13 February 2019. On 24 February 2019, it was announced that Ivana Pižlová, Andrea Jarchovská, and Kristýna Janků replaced Barbora Votíková, Petra Divišová, and Kateřina Svitková.

Finland
Coach:  Anna Signeul

The squad was announced on 14 February 2019. Heidi Kollanen replaced Tia Hälinen on 20 February 2019. Iina Salmi replaced Emmi Alanen due to injury.

North Korea
Coach: Kim Kwang-min

South Africa
Coach: Desiree Ellis

The squad was announced on 4 February 2019.

Group B

Hungary
Coach: Edina Markó

The squad was announced on 26 February 2019.

Italy
Coach: Milena Bertolini

The squad was announced on 18 February 2019.

Mexico
Coach: Christopher Cuéllar

A preliminary squad was named on 11 January 2019. The final squad was announced on 14 February 2019.

Thailand
Coach: Nuengrutai Srathongvian

The squad was announced on 23 February 2019.

Group C

Austria
Coach: Dominik Thalhammer

The squad was announced on 12 February 2019.

Belgium
Coach: Ives Serneels

The squad was announced on 17 February 2019.

Nigeria
Coach:  Thomas Dennerby

The squad was announced on 24 February 2019.

Slovakia
Coach: Peter Kopúň

The squad was announced on 11 February 2019. Jana Maslová was replaced by Monika Havranová before the beginning of the tournament.

Player representation

By club
Clubs with 5 or more players represented are listed.

By club nationality

By club federation

By representatives of domestic league

References

2019